Kawabata Dam  is a gravity dam located in Hokkaido Prefecture in Japan. The dam is used for power production. The catchment area of the dam is 780 km2. The dam impounds about 68 ha of land when full and can store 6,479 thousand cubic meters of water. The construction of the dam was started on 1954 and completed in 1962.

References

Dams in Hokkaido